Khogno Khan National Park is centered on Khogno Khan Mountain, about 60 km east of Kharakoram. The park features many historical sites, including the ruins of a 17th-century monastery.  It is located in Gurvanbulag District of Bulgan Province, about 240 km west of Ulaanbaatar.

See also
 List of national parks of Mongolia

References

External links
 Park borders, Khugnu-Tarna National Park, ProtectedPlanet.net

National parks of Mongolia